High Heat Major League Baseball 2003 was the second-to-last of a series of baseball computer games, released on PlayStation 2 and Microsoft Windows; a different game of the same name was released for the Game Boy Advance. The game, featuring the official licensed team and player names from all 30 MLB teams, was created by The 3DO Company, who later filed for bankruptcy in May 2003.

Reception

The PlayStation 2 version received "favorable" reviews, while the PC and Game Boy Advance versions received "mixed or average reviews", according to the review aggregation website Metacritic. In Japan, where the GBA version was ported and published by Takara on July 18, 2002, followed by the PS2 version on September 5, Famitsu gave the former a score of 23 out of 40.

References

External links

2002 video games
Cancelled GameCube games
PlayStation 2 games
Game Boy Advance games
Game Boy Advance-only games
Video games developed in the United Kingdom
Video games developed in the United States
Windows games